Steiner Arvid Kvalø (29 July 1922 – 18 May 2015) was a Norwegian fisherman and politician for the Labour Party.

He was born in Vikna in a fisher's family, and was a fisherman himself from 1946 to 1973. He was a member of Vikna municipal council from 1955 to 1971 and 1979 to 1983. He served as a deputy representative to the Parliament of Norway from Nord-Trøndelag during the terms 1969–1973, 1973–1977, 1977–1981. He was a full member from October 1973 following the death of Johan Støa, and throughout that term.

Among several board and committee memberships, especially in the fisheries sector, he was a board member of Norges Råfisklag from 1960 to 1991 and supervisory council member of Fiskernes Bank from 1963. He held honorary membership in the Labour Party.

References

1922 births
2015 deaths
People from Vikna
Norwegian fishers
Norwegian resistance members
Politicians from Nord-Trøndelag
Labour Party (Norway) politicians
Members of the Storting
20th-century Norwegian politicians